Vladimír Kafka (23 February 1931 – 19 October 1970) was a literature professor in Prague and a noted Czech translator.

Kafka is best known for translating books from the German language to the Czech language. He was noted for his contribution in bringing the world of German literature closer to Czech readers. Among his translations are translations of Franz Kafka's work (such as The Castle) and the translation of Günter Grass's The Tin Drum.

His son Tomáš Kafka was Czech Republic's Ambassador to Ireland, and to Germany, and is a poet and translator.

References

Czech translators
1931 births
1970 deaths
Translators of Franz Kafka
20th-century translators